Tadubi is a village in Senapati district, Manipur, India. The predominant inhabitant of the town belong to Mao Naga tribe. The National Highway 39 passes through Tadubi.

Demographics 
According to the 2011 census of India, Tabdubi has a population of 5,847. Around 91% of the people belong to the Scheduled Tribes.

Politics
Tadubi falls under the Old Manipur Lok Sabha Constituency and the Tadubi Assembly constituency.

See also 
 Hill College, Tadubi

References

Villages in Senapati district